Stoney 142, 143, 144 is an Indian reserve of the Stoney Nakoda First Nation, comprising Bearspaw, Chiniki, and Wesley First Nations in Alberta, located between the Municipal District of Bighorn No. 8 and Rocky View County. The largest community of the Nakoda people, it is 56 kilometers west of Calgary.

The community is spread along both sides of the Trans-Canada Highway, east of Banff National Park and north of Kananaskis Improvement District. In addition to Kananaskis, it is also bordered by Bighorn No. 8, Rocky View County, and the town of Cochrane. By land area, it is the third-largest Indian reserve in Canada (after Blood 148 and Siksika 146, both also in Alberta).

According to the Canada 2011 Census:
Population: 3,494
% Change (1996–2001): 0.7
% Change (2001–2011): 38.16
Dwellings: 795
Area (km2): 444.94
Density (persons per km2): 7.85

History
Most of the film Buffalo Bill and the Indians, or Sitting Bull's History Lesson was shot on location on the reserve. Frank "Sitting Wind" Kaquitts, who played Sitting Bull in the film, had been elected the first ever chief of Alberta's Nakoda (Stoney) First Nation, after three bands had amalgamated the year before. Kevin Costner's Open Range was also filmed on the reserve.  The film Little Big Man starring Dustin Hoffman and Chief Dan George was shot here also, and the first screening was held in Calgary so the tribe could attend.

The Stoney Reserve was badly damaged by a massive flood in June 2013 and hundreds of residents were evacuated from their homes.

See also
Nakoda (Stoney)

References

External links
 Stoney Nation
 Map of Stoney 142, 143, 144 at Statcan

Indian reserves in Alberta
Calgary Region
Nakoda (Stoney)